Conducting unbecoming may refer to:

 Conduct unbecoming, an offence that is subject to court martial in the armed forces of some nations
 Conduct Unbecoming (play), a 1969 play by Barry England
 Conduct Unbecoming (1975 film), a film adaptation of the play
 Conduct Unbecoming (2011 film), a Canadian film
 "Conduct Unbecoming" (Law & Order), an episode of Law & Order
 Conduct Unbecoming: Gays and Lesbians in the US Military, a 1993 book by Randy Shilts
 Conduct Unbecoming: The Rise and Ruin of Finley, Kumble, a book by Steven Kumble about the law firm Finley, Kumble, Wagner, Underberg, Manley, Myerson & Casey
 "Conduct Unbecoming", a 2006 series of articles in the Seattle Post-Intelligencer